Elias Fiigenschoug (c. 1600 – c. 1660) was a 17th-century Norwegian Baroque portrait and landscape painter.

Biography
Fiigenschoug worked in Bergen, Norway from about 1640 to 1660. He signed most of his work with characteristic EF. His oldest signed work is dated 1641, the last in 1657. Fiigenschoug had contact with artist circles in Amsterdam and was most probably educated in the Netherlands.  In portraits he was primarily influenced by Dutch portraiture, in a sober style, with certain personal characteristics and a refined technique. He painted a number of portraits featuring clergymen, merchants and civil leaders.

In addition to portraits, he performed religious motives, both epitaphs and paintings for church altarpieces with biblical motifs. His work appears in Ølve Church in Sunnhordland (1644),  at Voss Church  (1642) and at Skjerstad Church in Salten (1651-1652). He completed three major epitaphs  at St Mary's Church in Bergen (1643). His painting of Halsnøy Abbey on the island of Halsnøy from 1656 is regarded as the first Norwegian landscape painting.

Personal life
Fiigenschoug was married to Anna Christensdatter Bloch (1620–1689), daughter of bailiff Christen Jenssøn Bloch and Berethe Andersdatter Benkestok.

References

External links

Year of birth uncertain
Year of death uncertain
17th-century Norwegian painters
Norwegian male painters
Norwegian portrait painters
Norwegian landscape painters
Baroque painters